The Pondicherry football team is an Indian football team representing Puducherry in Indian state football competitions including the  Santosh Trophy. They have never won the trophy.

Squad
The following 22 players were called for the 2022–23 Santosh Trophy.

References

Santosh Trophy teams
Football in Puducherry